Parliament House in the Old Town in Edinburgh, Scotland, is a complex of several buildings housing the Supreme Courts of Scotland. The oldest part of the complex was home to the Parliament of Scotland from 1639 to 1707, and is the world's first purpose-built parliament building. Located just off the Royal Mile, beside St Giles' Cathedral, Parliament House is also the headquarters of the Faculty of Advocates, the Society of Writers to His Majesty's Signet, and the Society of Solicitors in the Supreme Courts of Scotland. Other buildings in the complex include the Advocates Library and the Signet Library. The entire complex is a Category A Listed building.

History 

In the 17th century, the Parliament of Scotland did not have a dedicated permanent home. Between 1438 and 1561, it had usually met in the Tolbooth in Edinburgh, a building which also housed the burgh council of Edinburgh and the Court of Session. From 1563 onwards Parliament regularly met in the chamber of the Court of Session, which was situated in the central aisle of St Giles' Cathedral. This chamber was becoming inadequate by the 1630s due to the increasing number of members of parliament. It was clear that Parliament required more suitable accommodation, there was a desire to restore St Giles’ solely to its original function as a place of worship, and Charles I requested that the burgh council provide a more commodious building. In March 1632, the council commissioned the building of a purpose-built parliamentary chamber, designed by James Murray, the King's Master of Works. The building cost £127,000 Scots, most of which came from Edinburgh's common good fund, with the remainder funded by public subscription from the citizens of Edinburgh.

Parliament House was built between 1632 and 1640 on the west side of the sloping ground between St Giles’ Cathedral and the Cowgate which was occupied by the burial grounds of St Giles'. The burial grounds had ceased to be used for burials in 1566 (with the exception of the burial of John Knox in 1572). Three manses on the site which were occupied by the ministers of St Giles' were demolished to accommodate the new building. Although Parliament House was not completed until 1640 it hosted the 1639 session of Parliament, which opened on 12 August 1639. The building was built on an L-shaped plan, with the main block having three storeys, with the Parliament Hall and the Laigh Hall or Laigh House on the upper two storeys, and below these there was an undercroft. The two-storey south-east wing, known as the Treasury, contained chambers on each floor.

The facade, overlooking Parliament Yard (later Parliament Square), was of ashlar, while the remainder of the building was rubble-built with ashlar dressings. The principal entrance was surmounted by a pediment containing the Royal Arms of Scotland, between statues of Justice and Mercy, beneath which was the Latin inscription 'Stant His Felicia Regna' ("Kingdoms stand happy by these virtues"). The statues, which were the work of Alexander Mylne, were removed around 1824, when the entrance doorway was demolished. They were recovered in 1909 and now stand inside Parliament House.

Parliament Hall, measuring 122 feet (40 m) by 49 feet (12 m), was used as the parliamentary chamber during sessions of parliament, and by the Court of Session when Parliament was not sitting. The main feature of Parliament Hall is the elaborate oak trussed flat roof supported on carved stone corbels. It was constructed in 1637 by John Scott, the Edinburgh master wright. In the 17th and 18th centuries the walls were hung with tapestries and portraits of Scottish monarchs. The stained glass Great Window, by Wilhelm von Kaulbach and Max Emanuel Ainmiller, was erected in 1868 and commemorates the establishment of the College of Justice by James V in 1532. Charles I became the first monarch to attend Parliament in the hall when he was present at the August-November 1641 session. The future monarchs James VII and Anne attended the 1681 session. Parliament Hall was also the venue for the parliamentary debates on the Treaty of Union between Scotland and England during the 1706-07 session.

Beneath Parliament Hall is the Laigh Hall, the original use of which remains unclear, although it may have been used for subsidiary parliamentary meetings or perhaps as a storage space. In 1662 the legal registers of Scotland were removed from the 'register house' in Edinburgh Castle to the Laigh Hall, as were parliamentary and other records in 1689. The national records would continue to be stored in the Laigh Hall until 1789. Edinburgh's infamous Maiden guillotine was also stored in the Laigh Hall at one point. The two-storey south-east wing, known as the Treasury, contained an entrance lobby on the ground floor, with the Court of Session occupying the two ground floor chambers. The upper floor contained the Treasury Room (used by the Treasurer and the later Treasury Board), the Council Chamber (used by the Privy Council), and the Exchequer Room (used by the Court of Exchequer). During parliamentary sessions all of these rooms would have been used by committees.

Courts

With the Acts of Union 1707, the Parliament of Scotland was dissolved, and Parliament House ceased to be used for its main original purpose. From then onwards the building was primarily used by the courts as the seat of the Court of Session, the High Court of Justiciary, the Admiralty Court, and the Court of Exchequer. The national records of Scotland were moved from the Laigh Hall to General Register House in 1789. From 1707 until 1844 the Lords Ordinary of the Court of Session sat in Parliament Hall, and as their courtroom the hall came to be known as the Outer House, while the judges of the Court of Session hearing appellate cases sat in one of the ground floor chambers in the south-east Treasury wing, which came to be known as the Inner House. Until the 19th century Parliament Hall was also, as the property of the town council, the main public hall of Edinburgh for the hosting of civic receptions. During music festivals held in 1815, 1819, and 1824, the hall hosted performances of George Frideric Handel's Messiah and Joseph Haydn's The Creation. A civic banquet was also held there during the visit of George IV to Edinburgh in 1822.

The early 19th century saw a series of changes. A new Court of Exchequer was built, and in 1808, when the Inner house was split into two divisions, the new courtroom for the Second Division was created to the west of Parliament Hall. Two courtrooms for Lords Ordinary were added south of Parliament Hall in 1818-20. By 1830 the east range, the Court of Exchequer, was complete and by 1838 the south range was built providing courtrooms for the High Court of Justiciary, replacing the 17th century Inner House courtroom in the Treasury wing with two new Inner House courts. The Lords Ordinary finally moved out of Parliament Hall in 1844 when four new courtrooms were built on the site of the 1818-20 courts. The bank building of 1827-29 on the east of the site was incorporated into the courts in 1881-6. In 1907-09 the Outer House Courts due south of Parliament Hall were remodelled and extended.

Today, Parliament House is the seat of the Court of Session, the highest civil court of Scotland. Most of the work of the High Court of Justiciary, the supreme criminal court of Scotland, takes place in the Justiciary Building in the Lawnmarket. Parliament Hall now remains open as a meeting place for lawyers.

Architecture

Robert Reid designed the exterior of the building (1803-10 and 1827-38). He gave the whole complex an overall unified Classical façade on the north side. This Parliament Square façade was strongly influenced by the Adam style, in particular their unexecuted designs for the quadrants of the Old College of the University of Edinburgh. The façade is a Classical, 3-storey, 31-bay, symmetrical U-plan, with a central advanced 5-bay pedimented hexastyle portico, a cornice and balustraded parapet with decorative panels inset, some surmounted by stone sphinxes.

The Advocates Library was founded in 1682, and is located in the William Henry Playfair-designed building (1830) to the west of the south end of Parliament Hall.  It remains a heavily used legal resource. As well as collecting legal works, it was also a deposit library, and in 1925 the non-legal books in their collection were given to the new National Library of Scotland, which is located next to the library, on George IV Bridge.

To the west of the north end of Parliament Hall is the Signet Library. It is a private library, funded by members of the Society of Writers to Her Majesty's Signet, who are generally practising solicitors. Construction began in 1810 to a design by Robert Reid, and it presents a classical front to Parliament Square.

See also
Courts of Scotland
Middlesex Guildhall
Royal Courts of Justice, Belfast
Royal Courts of Justice, London
Scots law

References

1640 establishments in Scotland
17th century in Scotland
17th century in Edinburgh
Buildings and structures completed in 1640
Category A listed buildings in Edinburgh
College of Justice
Court buildings in Scotland
History of Edinburgh
Legislative buildings in Europe
National supreme court buildings
Parliament of Scotland
Royal Mile
Scots law
Scottish parliamentary locations and buildings
Seats of national legislatures